Jay P. Williams (September 23, 1872 – July 4, 1938) was an American sailor serving in the United States Navy during the Boxer Rebellion. He received the Medal of Honor for bravery.

Biography
Williams was born September 23, 1872, in Orland, Indiana, and after entering the navy he was sent as an Coxswain to China to fight in the Boxer Rebellion.

He died July 4, 1938, and is buried in Woodlawn Cemetery Norwalk, Ohio. His grave can be found in section 9, Ave A to Ave B, row 2, grave 41.

Medal of Honor citation
Rank and organization: Coxswain, U.S. Navy. Born: 23 September 1872, Orland, Ind. Accredited to: Ohio. G.O. No.: 55, 19 July 1901.

Citation:

In action with the relief expedition of the Allied forces in China, 13, 20, 21 and 22 June 1900. During this period and in the presence of the enemy, Williams distinguished himself by meritorious conduct.

See also

List of Medal of Honor recipients
List of Medal of Honor recipients for the Boxer Rebellion

References

External links

1872 births
1938 deaths
United States Navy Medal of Honor recipients
United States Navy sailors
American military personnel of the Boxer Rebellion
People from Orland, Indiana
Boxer Rebellion recipients of the Medal of Honor